Ōhinode Takaaki (born 19 January 1970 as Takaaki Nishida) is a former sumo wrestler from Chikusa, Hyōgo, Japan.

Career
He played baseball in elementary and junior high school.  He was an amateur champion at Nihon University. He made his professional debut in January 1992, joining Tatsunami stable. His shikona means "great sunrise." He reached the juryo division in January 1997. It took him 30 tournaments to reach juryo from his professional debut.  In January 1998, ranked at the top of the makushita division, five of his seven bouts were against juryo ranked wrestlers, a record. He was promoted back to juryo after this tournament. He reached the top makuuchi division in March 1999, shortly after his old stablemaster, ex-sekiwake Annenyama, had retired and been replaced as Tatsunami Oyakata by ex-komusubi Asahiyutaka.  This was 43 tournaments after his debut, which at the time was the slowest amongst makushita tsukedashi entrants. By contrast, Miyabiyama, who made his top division debut in the same tournament, had begun as a makushita tsukedashi entrant just four tournaments earlier in July 1998. His highest rank was maegashira 9, which he achieved in May 1999. He retired from active competition in September 2000 due to a lung problem. Although this prevented him from doing sumo it did not affect his everyday life and he became a businessman upon leaving sumo.

Fighting style
Ōhinode was a yotsu-sumo (grappling) specialist who preferred a migi-yotsu (left hand outside, right hand inside) grip on his opponent's mawashi. His most common winning kimarite was yori-kiri (force out).

Career record

See also
Glossary of sumo terms
List of past sumo wrestlers

References

External links

1970 births
Living people
Japanese sumo wrestlers
Sumo people from Hyōgo Prefecture